U.S. Route 24 (US 24) is a United States Numbered Highway that runs from Minturn, Colorado, to Independence Township, Michigan. In Ohio, it is an expressway and freeway for much of its length, from the Indiana state line to Maumee. From there northeast to the Michigan state line at Toledo, it is a surface highway.

Route description

From the Indiana state line easterly to Baltimore Street at the border of unincorporated Defiance Township and the city of Defiance, US 24 is an expressway which mostly has interchanges, but features intersections with select county and township roads. From Baltimore Street to State Route 281 at the border of Defiance and unincorporated Noble Township, US 24 is a freeway. From SR 281 to US 6 west in Henry County's Napoleon Township, US 24 is once again an expressway. From US 6 west to Interstate 475 (I-475) in the city of Maumee, US 24 is a freeway. The route continues northeasterly as a surface street through downtown Maumee and the western side of Toledo, where it turns into Telegraph Road and stays on it past the Michigan state line. The route then continues northerly into Michigan as a north–south highway.

History

Upgrades to the route around Napoleon began in 2008. This included the construction of a new route from east of Napoleon to north of Waterville, bypassing the original routing of the highway. This rerouting was done to "alleviate safety concerns caused by the mixture of truck traffic and residential travel" along US 24's former routing. New alignments west of Defiance through to Interstate 469 in Fort Wayne, Indiana, were also built in the late 2000s. The conversion to an expressway, first proposed in 1969, was done due to the high number of road accidents along the old alignment, which comprised only two lanes and was frequently used by tractor-trailers.

Major intersections

References

External links

U.S. Route 24 Realignment/Expansion ODOT website

24
 Ohio
Transportation in Paulding County, Ohio
Transportation in Defiance County, Ohio
Transportation in Henry County, Ohio
Transportation in Lucas County, Ohio